Louis Moore Bacon (born July 25, 1956) is an American investor, hedge fund manager, and philanthropist. He is the founder and chief executive of Moore Capital Management.

Forbes Magazine estimates his net worth to be US$1.81 billion, making him the 374th richest person on the Forbes 400 as of February 2017.

Early life and education
Bacon was born in Raleigh, North Carolina on July 25, 1956. His father, Zachary Bacon Jr., founded real estate company Bacon & Co. and later led Prudential Financial’s and Merrill Lynch’s real estate efforts in North Carolina.

Bacon graduated from Episcopal High School in Alexandria, Virginia. He attended Middlebury College in Vermont where he received his BA in American literature, graduating in 1979. Bacon met Walter Frank while he was working on a fishing boat on Long Island. He was given a job clerking at the specialist firm Walter N. Frank & Co during the summers of his college years. He subsequently received his MBA degree in finance at Columbia Business School in 1981.

While at Columbia, Bacon traded commodities using a low interest loan he had received. During the first three semesters, he lost money and was forced to borrow money from his father to pay for necessities. He turned a profit during his fourth semester.

Investment career
After receiving his MBA, Bacon joined the sales and trading program at Bankers Trust. Later he left the firm and returned to Walter N. Frank & Co. where he traded currencies. Bacon took a job on the floor of the New York Cotton Exchange, working as a "runner". Bacon later worked as a broker and trader of financial futures at Shearson Lehman Brothers and eventually became the senior vice president for their futures trading division.

In 1987 Bacon founded Remington Trading Partners. His market insights allowed him to profit during the market crash and subsequent rebound. In 1989, Bacon used his middle name when he founded Moore Capital Management LLC; in 1990 he founded Moore Global Investments, using $25,000 inherited from his family.

In 2006, Forbes magazine ranked Bacon as the 746th richest person in the world; in 2011 it ranked him as the 736th richest man.  In 2010, the Denver Post reported that Bacon's net worth of $1.6 billion ranked him as the 238th richest American. In March 2010 Forbes Magazine estimated Bacon's net worth to be $1.5 billion, and ranked him as the 655th richest person in the world.

In December 2013, Bacon purchased Taos Ski Valley from the Blake family, who had owned it since 1954.

As of March 2022, Bacon holds a substantial interest in EV startup, Fisker Inc. with Bacon's Moore Capital Management holding 8.45 million Fisker shares.

Lawsuits

Libel suit

In May 2011, Bacon obtained a court order in Great Britain, where he owned property, compelling the Wikimedia Foundation, WordPress and the Denver Post  to reveal the identity of anonymous persons who allegedly defamed him on their websites.  The court granted Bacon's application to serve a Norwich Pharmacal Order by email against these websites. Bacon sought the order so that he could launch defamation proceedings against online commenters he alleged to have posted libelous material about him on these websites.

In May 2011, the High Court in London granted Bacon a court order to obtain information from the Wikimedia Foundation, The Denver Post, and WordPress as to the identities of internet users alleged to have defamed him by their postings. Legal experts suggested compliance with the orders was unlikely, given the US tradition of freedom of speech, and the fact that US courts typically required "actual evidence or sufficient allegations of libel" before granting similar orders.

Legal experts did not believe the order was enforceable in the United States because of its policy related to freedom of speech.  Initially, the Foundation agreed to give the information to Bacon's solicitors, but later said it would cooperate only with a court order in the U.S., saying "Please note that we do not comply with foreign subpoenas absent an immediate threat to life or limb." Automattic, which owns WordPress, said Bacon would need a court order but agreed to remove any defamatory material from its websites.

Feud with Peter Nygård 

He is in conflict with Peter Nygård, against the backdrop of neighborhood feuds in the Bahamas, where they both own adjoining luxury properties. He has hired private investigators to look into sex crime charges against Peter Nygård and is suspected of using the Israeli company "Team Jorge" to run an online smear campaign against his rival.

In early 2019, it was reported that Peter Nygård had filed a complaint with the U.S. Federal Court in Manhattan alleging that Bacon had violated sections of the Racketeer Influenced and Corrupt Organizations Act.

Personal life
In 1986 Bacon married Cynthia Pigott, a former Newsweek magazine staff reporter. They divorced in 2002, after having four children together.

In 2007, he married Gabrielle Sacconaghi in Manhattan.

In November 2007, Bacon purchased the Trinchera Ranch in Costilla County, Colorado from the Forbes family. The  property sold for $175 million. In 2010, Bacon purchased the Orton Plantation in North Carolina, which was built in 1735 by an ancestor, Roger Moore, son of James Moore.

In 2002 Bacon obtained Austrian citizenship, due to a special provision for figures who have  made notable achievements for Austria. The decision was criticised, as no achievement by Bacon on behalf of Austria was documented.

Political and economic views
Bacon contributed £500,000 to Britain's Conservative Party between 2010 and 2016. Bacon also served as a fundraiser for American politician Mitt Romney, who was elected governor of Massachusetts and later ran for president. In 2015, Bacon donated $1 million to a Super PAC supporting the presidential candidacy of Jeb Bush.

Wealth
In 1991, Bacon was 20th on the list of Financial World's Top 100 Wall Street Earners list.

Philanthropy
In 1992, Bacon created The Moore Charitable Foundation (MCF) to provide financial support to nonprofit organizations that work to preserve and protect wildlife habitat and improve water systems. Bacon has donated more than one million dollars to the environmental non-profit organization Riverkeeper.

In June 2012, United States Secretary of Interior Ken Salazar and United States Fish and Wildlife Service Director Daniel M. Ashe announced Bacon intends to donate a conservation easement totaling approximately 90,000 acres in the Sangre de Cristo Mountains bordering the San Luis Valley in Colorado. This easement will provide the founding tract for the proposed new Sangre de Cristo Conservation Area.

Bacon owns the Trinchera Blanca Ranch located in the San Luis Valley. The Trinchera section of the ranch is currently protected by an easement administered by Colorado Open Lands. The new conservation easement Bacon intends to donate is to protect Blanca – thus protecting all 172,000 acres of land.

In addition to his work in Colorado, Bacon has helped preserve and protect environmentally sensitive land in New York, North Carolina, and the Bahamas. His key conservation projects include:

 Robins Island, Long Island, New York: After purchasing the "Jewel of the Peconic" in 1993, Bacon secured the permanent protection of the land through a conservation easement and set about restoring a natural habitat that had been deteriorating for 300 years.
 Cow Neck Farm, Long Island, New York: Bacon's Cow Neck Preserve, LLC purchased the farm in 1998 and donated a 540-acre conservation easement to the Peconic Land Trust, thus preventing development and ensuring the protection of the area's habitat.
 Lyford Cay, Bahamas: Bacon is involved with the environmental restoration of Lyford Cay.

Legacy and awards 
In 2008, he was inducted into Institutional Investors Alpha's Hedge Fund Manager Hall of Fame.

He is the 2013 recipient of the Audubon Medal, given in recognition of outstanding achievement in the field of conservation and environmental protection. In 2016, Bacon received a Theodore Roosevelt Conservation Partnership's Lifetime Conservation Achievement Award for authorizing conservation easements on more than 210,600 acres in the US.

References

External links
Extensive biographical article at Forbes
News from Financial World magazine
"Hedge Fund Giant Louis Bacon's Bold Mission To Save The American West," Forbes, October 8, 2012
How a Neighbors’ Feud in Paradise Launched an International Rape Case

1956 births
American billionaires
American financial analysts
American financiers
American hedge fund managers
American investors
American money managers
American stock traders
Businesspeople from New York (state)
Columbia Business School alumni
Episcopal High School (Alexandria, Virginia) alumni
Living people
Middlebury College alumni
Businesspeople from Raleigh, North Carolina
Stock and commodity market managers
New York (state) Republicans
O'Moore family
People from Costilla County, Colorado
Naturalised citizens of Austria